Tatiana Ferdman is a former international table tennis player from the Soviet Union.

Table tennis career
She won three World Championship medals including a gold medal in the Mixed Doubles event with Stanislav Gomozkov at the World Table Tennis Championships in 1975.

She also won an English Open title.

See also
 List of table tennis players
 List of World Table Tennis Championships medalists

References

Soviet table tennis players
Russian female table tennis players
Living people
1957 births